Miss Hall's School, located in Pittsfield, Massachusetts, is a selective independent school for girls in grades 9–12. Founded in 1898 by Mira Hinsdale Hall, a graduate of Smith College, it was one of the first girls' boarding schools established in New England.

Today, Miss Hall's School offers a college preparatory curriculum augmented by two programs, Horizons, and the Girls Leadership Project.

History 

Miss Hall's School has chosen to date its founding from 1898, as that is when Miss Mira Hinsdale Hall began her forty-year leadership. A broader historical view would be that the present school is a successor institution to one founded in 1800 by Miss Hall's great aunt, Nancy Hinsdale. That was the first girls' boarding school established in Massachusetts and the first attempt to provide advanced education for young women in the town of Pittsfield. In 1898 Miss Hall bought the school that was sitting at South and Reed streets and began to apply her many talents to its expansion. For the next nine years, Miss Hall not only enrolled high school girls but also incorporated a coeducational primary day program into her school.

The School held, in 1906, certification in the New England Entrance Certificate Board, which allowed students who satisfactorily completed the College Preparatory Course to be admitted to Mt. Holyoke, Smith, Vassar, Wellesley, and Wells "without examination."

In 1908, Mira Hall bought the Colonel Walter Cutting Estate at the present location of the School, 492 Holmes Road. The School was officially moved to the new location in 1909, and the coeducational day school was discontinued. While still offering two courses of study, the "general academic" and "college preparatory," the School grew in reputation, and Mira Hall was well established nationally as a progressive educator of young women.

In February 1923, a fire broke out in the ceiling of the school's gymnasium. All of the students and faculty escaped safely, but the fire took the life of one employee and destroyed the estate. A model of vision and gumption, Mira Hall, then 60 years old, chose to rebuild and in October 1924 the school's current Georgian building was completed. At that time, the school incorporated as a non-profit educational institution and established a self-perpetuating board of trustees. Winthrop M. Crane Jr. became the first board president. Miss Hall's School continued to grow in reputation and became a nationally recognized college-preparatory school for girls. In 1931, Fortune Magazine, reporting on the modern trend in feminine education in private schools, listed Miss Hall's among the nation's top ten schools.

Mira Hall died suddenly on August 25, 1937, while on vacation in Maine.

Campus
The Georgian-style,  Main Building was built in 1923. It underwent an eight-year, renovation and expansion that began in 1996. In this building are classrooms, laboratories, choral and instrumental music rehearsal space, administrative offices, the Humes Euston Hall Library, and residential hallways. Other campus sites include the Anne Meyer Cross Athletic Center, Ara West Grinnell Teaching Greenhouse, Elizabeth Gatchell Klein Arts Center, New Dorm, and Linn Hall.

Notable alumnae
Ubah Ali, anti-FGM activist from Somaliland
Jean Erdman, an influential figure in the world of modern dance and  part of the Martha Graham Dance Company
Jacqueline Mars, (born October 10, 1939) is an American heiress to the Mars Candy Company and a notable investor.
Zelia Peet Ruebhausen, policy advisor, UN observer
Countess Xenia Czernichev-Besobrasov (1929-1968), Russian aristocrat and wife of Archduke Rudolf of Austria

References

External links

The Association of Boarding Schools profile

1898 establishments in Massachusetts
Boarding schools in Massachusetts
Buildings and structures in Pittsfield, Massachusetts
Educational institutions established in 1898
Girls' schools in Massachusetts
Private high schools in Massachusetts
Private preparatory schools in Massachusetts
Schools in Berkshire County, Massachusetts